is a private university in Machida, Tokyo, Japan. The university was founded by Yasuzo Shimizu.  Its name is derived from that of pastor and philanthropist J. F. Oberlin, and the name also shows the university's historical ties with Oberlin College in Oberlin, Ohio, which the university's founder attended.

Reconnaissance Japan program 
English-speaking foreign students may study for a semester or year at J. F. Oberlin through the university's Reconnaissance Japan (RJ) program.  In the RJ program, students take a Japanese language course (which can be tested out of) as well as English-language courses in Japanese culture.  During their study at J. F. Oberlin, students may stay with a Japanese host family, live in a university-provided apartment such as New Shimura Heights, or International House (known by students as Pink House), or find their own housing.
J. F. Oberlin has a number of international partner academic institutions from which students are welcomed to study in the RJ program.

Faculties 
College of Arts and Sciences
College of Business Management
College of Health and Welfare
College of Performing and Visual Arts
College of Global communication

Junior college 

The junior college of Oberlin University was founded in 1950 and became coeducational in 1999. It was closed in 2007.

Notable alumni and faculty 
Yinling: Japan-based swimsuit model, race queen, singer and former professional wrestler
Yuka Kashino: member of technopop group Perfume
Ayano Ōmoto: member of technopop group Perfume
Matt Kuwata: tarento, model, and musician

References

External links
Obirin University's homepage
Oberlin Center for International Studies

J. F. Oberlin University
Christian universities and colleges in Japan
Private universities and colleges in Japan
Educational institutions established in 1921
1921 establishments in Japan
Association of Christian Universities and Colleges in Asia
Western Metropolitan Area University Association
Machida, Tokyo